Yi-Chuan Lin (born 11 November 1985) is a Taiwanese baseball infielder for the Uni-President Lions of the Chinese Professional Baseball League (CPBL). He has previously played in the CPBL for the Fubon Guardians.

He was the first position player to be named Rookie of the Year and MVP in the Chinese Professional Baseball League the same year.

Career

Sinon Bulls/EDA Rhinos/Fubon Guardians
Lin debuted for the Taiwan national baseball team in the 2005 Asian Baseball Championship, which he led in home runs. He hit .250/.294/.313 as a part-time third sacker in the 2005 Baseball World Cup. In the 2006 Intercontinental Cup, he hit .135/.158/.162 as the starting third baseman for Taiwan. He batted .306/.342/.500 in the 2007 World Port Tournament – he tied Sidney de Jong for fifth in the tournament in home runs (2), tied Yosvani Peraza for 6th in runs (6) and was 6th in RBI (5). His offensive production was similar to the USA's third baseman, top prospect Pedro Alvarez. He helped Taiwan win a Silver Medal. In the 2007 Baseball World Cup, Lin went 0 for 1 as the backup third baseman to Tai-Shan Chang.

Lin hit .130/.231/.174 for Taiwan in the 2008 Final Olympic Qualification Tournament as the starting third baseman. Despite his struggles, they won a spot in the 2008 Summer Olympics. Lin had a couple defensive gaffes in a loss to the South Korean national baseball team. In the second inning, he did not get to a grounder by Dae-ho Lee that reporters said was within his range. Later in the inning, he again did not get to a ball in close range of third hit by Jin-man Park. The two plays, coupled with a Che-Hsuan Lin miscue, contributed to two Korean runs and the win.

Lin was the top pick in the 2007 CPBL draft, taken by the Sinon Bulls. He had played for the amateur Fubon Bull previously. He did not play in 2008, as he was fulfilling his military commitment. In late 2008, he announced that he didn't want to play for Sinon when he came out of the military and that he wanted to remain an amateur. Lin changed his mind and signed with Sinon in March 2009, inking a deal with a signing bonus equivalent to $145,000. That was the second-largest bonus in CPBL history, behind Chung-Nan Tsai and even with Chang-Wei Tu, Chih-Yuan Chen and Yi-Cheng Tseng.

Lin was 0 for 8 with two strikeouts as one of Taiwan's worst performers in the 2009 World Baseball Classic.

Lin had a great pro debut. Manning first base and hitting 7th, he was 3 for 4 in Sinon's 2009 opener. He reached 100 hits in 249 AB and 62 games, the fastest player to that mark in CPBL history to that point. On August 13, he set new CPBL rookie records for RBI (77, surpassing Tai-Shan Chang) and hits (119, breaking the mark held by Chih-Wei Shih). He hit .348/.395/.543 for the 2009 CPBL campaign and drove in 113 runs, breaking Tilson Brito's CPBL record. He finished 4th in average (behind Wu-Hsiung Pan, Cheng-Min Peng and Wilton Veras), second in hits (169, behind Veras) and third in home runs (18, behind Chih-Sheng Lin and Chin-Feng Chen). He won a Gold Glove at first base and made the Best Ten. He was named Rookie of the Year and MVP, the third player and first position player ever to accomplish that double honor; En-Yu Lin had been the last pitcher to pull off the feat (in 2005).

He played in the 2013 World Baseball Classic. 2013CPBL Home Run Derbychampion.

Lin won the Taiwan Series with the then EDA Rhinos in 2016. Lin was in the Opening Day lineup for the Fubon Guardians in 2021.

Uni-President Lions
On January 19, 2023, Lin signed with the Uni-President Lions of the Chinese Professional Baseball League.

Career statistics

References

External links 
IBAF site
Harry Weidemeijer's international tourney stats
Taiwan Baseball Blog
World Baseball Classic

1985 births
2009 World Baseball Classic players
2013 World Baseball Classic players
2015 WBSC Premier12 players
2017 World Baseball Classic players
Asian Games medalists in baseball
Baseball players at the 2010 Asian Games
Fubon Guardians players
EDA Rhinos players
Living people
Baseball players from Tainan
Sinon Bulls players
Medalists at the 2010 Asian Games
Asian Games silver medalists for Chinese Taipei